First African Baptist Church and Parsonage is an historically significant church building and an associated parsonage located in the United States on West Jefferson Avenue in Georgetown, Kentucky.  In 1842, First Baptist Church moved from their West Jefferson location to a site closer to Georgetown College on College and Hamilton Streets. The church's previous building and property were leased to local black Baptists so a new congregation solely for blacks could be formed. The current building was constructed in 1870. The buildings were added to the U.S. National Register of Historic Places in 1984.

History
The First Baptist Church congregation in Georgetown, Kentucky was organized in 1811, and its first meeting house erected on West Jefferson Street in 1815. In 1842 Howard Malcom, the pastor of the church and president of Georgetown College, urged the relocation of the church to a site near the college. The congregation moved from their West Jefferson location to a site on College and Hamilton Streets. The building at the original site was leased to black congregation. G. W. Dupee, a slave, was the first official pastor of the black congregation. Reuben Lee was pastor when the current building was constructed in 1870.

Architecture
The church building has a Gothic Revival style. The original twin doors to accommodate women and men separately entering have been closed on the front facade and replaced with "a single centered entrance highlighted by three lancet arches."

See also
National Register of Historic Places listings in Kentucky

References

Baptist churches in Kentucky
National Register of Historic Places in Scott County, Kentucky
Churches completed in 1870
19th-century Baptist churches in the United States
Buildings and structures in Georgetown, Kentucky
Churches on the National Register of Historic Places in Kentucky
African-American history of Kentucky
First African Baptist churches
Clergy houses in the United States
1870 establishments in Kentucky